The organ of Poblet is a three manual, 56 stop pipe organ installed in the church of the Abbey of Santa Maria of Poblet (Catalonia, Spain). It was built in 2012 by the Swiss firm Metzler Orgelbau AG.

Technical description and information 
The instrument is entirely mechanical in both key and stop actions. The slider chests, case, pipe work and all components were manufactured directly by Metzler craftsmen under the supervision of the organ builder Joan Carles Castro (Barcelona). The instrument installation includes:  
– 56 stops on a three manual console and pedalboard
– Approximately 3,500 pipes, whose lengths range from 5 meters down to the shortest at 1 centimetre.
– The dimensions of the instrument are:
Height: 8.70 m
Width: 7.20 m
Depth: 4.10 m

Tonal conception 
It is an instrument of interregional Baroque sound aesthetics, i.e., a well-balanced synthesis of the most significant features of the European organ schools of the Baroque era. The tonal design is based on the German Baroque style, centered in the music of J. S. Bach. However the instrument also includes bright reeds, mutations and fonds of French and Spanish character, and late Baroque elements. The voicing and tonal finishing were in charge of Andreas Metzler in consultation with the Abbey's main organist Josep Antoni Peramos, O. Cist.

Specifications

See also

 Organ
 Abbey of Poblet

References

External links
 Abbey of Poblet
 Metzler Orgelbau AG

Poblet
Conca de Barberà